This page shows the results of the Racquetball Competition for men and women at the 1999 Pan American Games, held from July 23 to August 8, 1999 in Winnipeg, Manitoba, Canada.

Men's competition

Singles

Doubles

Women's competition

Singles

Doubles

Medal table

References

1999 in racquetball
1999
Events at the 1999 Pan American Games
Racquetball in Canada